Claus Marius Neergaard (18 July 1911 – 22 December 1990) was a Norwegian politician for the Labour Party.

He was born in Kristiansund.

He was elected to the Norwegian Parliament from Møre og Romsdal in 1961. He was not re-elected in 1965, only serving one term. He did not hold any elected positions in local politics.

References

1911 births
1990 deaths
Politicians from Kristiansund
Labour Party (Norway) politicians
Members of the Storting
20th-century Norwegian politicians